The Council of Ontario Universities (COU) provides a forum for Ontario’s universities to collaborate and advocate in support of their shared mission to the benefit and prosperity of students, communities and the province of Ontario.  A membership organization consisting of Ontario's 20 publicly assisted universities and one associate member, the Royal Military College of Canada, COU works with members to find consensus on a wide range of university issues and advances them with government and other stakeholders.

The Ontario Universities' Application Centre, a division of COU, is the processing centre for all of the province's universities. It collects and distributes applications for undergraduate, professional and selected graduate programs. The centre's website provides data on applications each year.

Member Institutions
Algoma University 
Brock University 
Carleton University 
University of Guelph 
Lakehead University 
Laurentian University 
McMaster University 
Nipissing University 
OCAD University
Ontario Tech University 
University of Ottawa 
Queen's University 
Toronto Metropolitan University 
Trent University 
University of Toronto 
University of Waterloo 
Western University 
Wilfrid Laurier University 
University of Windsor 
York University

Associate Member Institution
Royal Military College of Canada

External links
 Council of Ontario Universities' website
 Ontario's Universities
 Ontario Universities' Application Centre (OUAC)
 eINFO - a guide to Ontario's universities
 Accessible Campus

References

Universities in Ontario
Higher education in Ontario
1962 establishments in Ontario
College and university associations and consortia in Canada